The Horserace Betting Levy Appeal Tribunal is a non-departmental public body in the Department for Digital, Culture, Media and Sport of the Government of the United Kingdom. It was established in 1963.

History 
In 2013, the Tribunal was reported as one of the "200 bodies" needed to be replicated in an Independent Scotland.

Reforms were announced by the second May ministry in 2017.

References 

Department for Digital, Culture, Media and Sport
Horse racing organisations in Great Britain
1963 establishments in the United Kingdom
United Kingdom tribunals